Gordon Eric "Gerry" Daly (19 January 1915 – 6 August 1977) was an Australian rules footballer who played with Melbourne in the Victorian Football League (VFL).

Daly was born in Numurkah but recruited from the Sandhurst Football Club of Bendigo. He experienced considerable team success during his short VFL career, not playing in a loss until his 14th appearance. Daly was also a member of Melbourne's 1941 premiership team, as a forward pocket. He kicked one of only two career goals in the 29-point grand final win.

From 1942 to 1945, he did not feature in the VFL due to the war, during which time he served with the Australian Army. He returned to Melbourne in the 1946 season, but would play just three games.

References

External links

DemonWiki profile

1915 births
Australian rules footballers from Victoria (Australia)
Melbourne Football Club players
Sandhurst Football Club players
Australian Army personnel of World War II
1977 deaths
Australian Army soldiers
Melbourne Football Club Premiership players
One-time VFL/AFL Premiership players